Lumen Christi College  is an independent Roman Catholic coeducational secondary day school, located the Perth south-eastern suburb of Martin, Western Australia.

The school provides a religious and general education to students from Year 7 to Year 12. The school has five houses, Campbell, Mackillop, Salvado, Tangney & Yagan.

History 
The school was founded in 1984 with its first intake of 150 Year 8 students. The school currently has a six-stream enrolment of over 900 students ranging from Years 7–12.

See also

 List of schools in the Perth metropolitan area
 Catholic education in Australia

References

Catholic secondary schools in Perth, Western Australia
Educational institutions established in 1984
1984 establishments in Australia